Mana Parbat III is a mountain of the Garhwal Himalaya in Uttarakhand, India. It is 43rd highest located entirely within the Uttrakhand. Nanda Devi, is the highest mountain in this category. It is located 2.1 km ESE of Mana Parbat I  and 1.4 km north west lies Pilapani Parbat . On the south side lies the Chandra Parbat I  and Bhgirathi Massif  on the south west side.

Glaciers and rivers
It is surrounded by glaciers on all the sides: Kalindi Glacier on the southern side, Arwa Glacier on the eastern side, Mana Glacier on the northern side and Raktavarn Glacier on the western side. Kalindi Glacier joins with Chaturangi Glacier and Chaturangi Glacier joins with Gangotri Glacier from there emerges the river Bhagirathi the main tributaries of river Ganga. Mana glacier on the other side drains into Jadh Ganga also called Jahanvi Ganga that joins Bhagirathi near Bhaironghati. Arwa nala starts from Arwa glacier that drains into Saraswati river near Ghastoli that ultimately joins Alaknanda river at Mana village.

Neighboring peaks

Neighboring peaks of Mana Parbat III:
 Mana Parbat I: 
 Mana Parbat II: 
 Kalindi peak: 
 Pilapani Parbat: 
 Chandra Parbat I:

See also
 List of Himalayan peaks of Uttarakhand

References

Mountains of Uttarakhand
Six-thousanders of the Himalayas
Geography of Chamoli district